Jeannette Elizabeth Brown (born May 13, 1934) is a retired American organic medicinal chemist, historian, and author.

Life and education
Brown was born in 1934 in The Bronx, New York.  According to Brown, when she was young, she contracted tuberculosis, and was treated by Arthur Logan. Logan was a young African-American in his intern year of residency, and lived in Brown's building. Brown's later inspiration to study science came from asking Logan how one could become a doctor. He replied, "Oh, you study science".  Brown excelled in particular in chemistry, scoring 98 out of 100 on the New York State Regents chemistry exam. She attended New Dorp High School on Staten Island, and graduated in 1952. Brown earned her bachelor's degree in chemistry at Hunter College in 1956, one of two African Americans in the inaugural class of Hunter's chemistry program. In 1958, she became the first African American woman to achieve a master's degree from the University of Minnesota in organic chemistry. Her master's thesis was entitled, “Study of Dye and Ylide Formation in Salts of 9-(P-dimethylaminophenyl) Fluorene.”

Chemical research
After receiving her master's degree, Brown began work as a research chemist at CIBA Pharmaceutical Company, where she was involved in research programs for drug development targeting tuberculosis and coccidiosis. She moved to Merck in 1969, where she co-authored 15 publications, obtained one patent and contributed to 5 others. Brown's work focused on synthesizing novel medicinal compounds. She worked to develop the compound cilastatin sodium. Cilastatin is an inhibitor of renal dehydropeptidase. Since the antibiotic, imipenem, is one such antibiotic that is hydrolyzed by dehydropeptidase, cilastatin is used in combination with imipenem to prevent its metabolism. This combination creates the antibiotic Primaxin (imipenem/cilastatin), which is used to treat severe internal infections, as well as diseases caused by flesh-eating bacteria and some types of pneumonia. In order to succeed in industry, she believed that one needed to be an effective communicator, be able to work on a team, and have a strong scientific education in an ever-changing field.

Outreach 
Brown spent 36 years in research before she switched over to education. From 1993 to 2002 she was a visiting professor at the New Jersey Institute of Technology,  where she also helped recruit black students to enter STEM fields and worked on science education issues in the state. It was here that she also tutored middle school and high school chemistry teachers. She also won a grant from the Camille and Henry Dreyfus Foundation which she put towards tutoring chemistry teachers. Brown has also devoted significant professional effort to diversity and outreach projects; she served on the National Science Foundation Committee on Equal Opportunities for Women Minorities and Persons with Disabilities and was the historian of the American Chemical Society's Women Chemist Committee. To this day, Brown continues to mentor both middle and high school students through the Freddie and Ada Brown Award. She founded this award in 2010 in honor of her parents.

Work as historian 
As a historian of science, Brown contributed seven biographical profiles of African American chemists to the African American National Biography Project, of which contained the first African American women to get their Ph.D's degrees in chemistry and chemical engineering. She is the author of the 2011 book African American Women Chemists, which profiles early African American women in chemistry. Her second book African American Women Chemists in the Modern Era focuses on contemporary women who have benefited from the Civil Rights Act and are now working as chemists or chemical engineers.

Quotations 
In an interview with the University of Minnesota, Brown advises young women entering the scientific fields to plow ahead despite the inevitable slights that will come their way. “You just got to keep going,” she said. “You can't stop. If you stop, you're not going to get what you want.”

“Go straight for a Ph.D. Do not stop at a master's degree,” she said. “If you're a Ph.D., then you're the boss.”

"I think working hard and learning new things keeps you young."

Books 
African American Women Chemists in the Modern Era (2018)
African-American Women Chemists (2011)

Awards and honors
 1991, Elected to Hunter College Hall of Fame
2004, Société de Chimie Industrielle Fellow of the Chemical Heritage Foundation (American Section)
2005, Outstanding Achievement Award Recipient, University of Minnesota
2005, National Award for Encouraging Disadvantaged Students into Careers in the Chemical Sciences recipient, American Chemical Society
2007, Association for Women in Science fellow
 2009, Glenn E. & Barbara Hodson Ullyot Scholar of the Chemical Heritage Foundation
 2009, American Chemical Society fellow in the Division of Professional Relations
 2020, Henry Hill Award, American Chemical Society

References

1934 births
Living people
Organic chemists
Medicinal chemistry
American women chemists
21st-century American historians
American women historians
Historians of science
American biographers
New Jersey Institute of Technology faculty
Hunter College alumni
University of Minnesota College of Science and Engineering alumni
20th-century American women scientists
People from Hillsborough Township, New Jersey
Writers from Summit, New Jersey
20th-century American women writers
20th-century American chemists
20th-century American non-fiction writers
21st-century American women writers
American women biographers
New Dorp High School alumni